Mirrorshades: The Cyberpunk Anthology (1986) is a cyberpunk short story collection, edited by American writer Bruce Sterling.

Contents
 "The Gernsback Continuum" by William Gibson
 "Snake-Eyes" by Tom Maddox
 "Rock On" by Pat Cadigan
 "Tales of Houdini" by Rudy Rucker
 "400 Boys" by Marc Laidlaw
 "Solstice" by James Patrick Kelly
 "Petra" by Greg Bear
 "Till Human Voices Wake Us" by Lewis Shiner
 "Freezone" by John Shirley
 "Stone Lives" by Paul Di Filippo
 "Red Star, Winter Orbit" by Bruce Sterling and William Gibson
 "Mozart in Mirrorshades" by Bruce Sterling and Lewis Shiner

References

1986 anthologies
American short story collections
Cyberpunk short stories